Events from the year 1823 in Singapore.

Incumbents
 Resident: Maj-Gen. William Farquhar (until 1 May), Dr. John Crawfurd (starting 27 May)

Events

May
 1 May - William Farquhar was dismissed from his position as First Resident by Stamford Raffles .

June
 5 June - Stamford Raffles lays the foundation stone for the Singapore Institution, now known as the Raffles Institution.

See also
 List of years in Singapore

References

1823
Singapore
Singapore
19th century in Singapore